Oliver Setzinger (born July 11, 1983) is an Austrian professional ice hockey forward currently playing for EC Weiz of the fourth tier Austrian League.

Playing career
Setzinger was selected by the Nashville Predators in the 3rd round (76th overall) of the 2001 NHL Entry Draft. After a short-lived experience in the AHL, he moved to Switzerland in 2007, where he played with HC Davos and SC Langnau Tigers in the Swiss National League A before signing a one-year contract with an option for two more seasons with Lausanne HC in National League B in 2010.

He extended with Lausanne to a new three-year contract in December 2010. LHC and Setzinger went on to win the National League B title and to get promoted in April 2013, upsetting Langnau in the promotion-relegation game, after many unfruitful attempts including 2 promotion-relegation games lost to EHC Biel over 8 years spent playing in second division. In the 2013–14 season, he tallied 34 points in 50 games and contributed to LHC clinching a playoff spot in the Swiss elite league for the first time in the club's history.

On July 11, 2014, Setzinger moved in a return to the Austrian Hockey League, signing with EC KAC of the EBEL.

After two successful seasons in Klagenfurt, Setzinger left as a free agent in agreeing to a three-year deal with fellow Austrian club, Graz 99ers, on July 4, 2016.

International play
Setzinger took part in the 2001, 2002, 2003, 2004, 2005, 2007, 2009 and 2011 IIHF World Championship as a member of the Austria men's national ice hockey team as well as the 2002 and 2014 Winter Olympics in Salt Lake City and Sochi.

Career statistics

Regular season and playoffs

International

References

External links

1983 births
Austrian ice hockey centres
EHC Black Wings Linz players
Genève-Servette HC players
Graz 99ers players
HC Davos players
HPK players
Ice hockey players at the 2002 Winter Olympics
Ice hockey players at the 2014 Winter Olympics
Ilves players
KalPa players
EC KAC players
Lahti Pelicans players
Lausanne HC players
Living people
Milwaukee Admirals players
Nashville Predators draft picks
Olympic ice hockey players of Austria
People from Horn, Austria
Romanian Hockey League players
SCL Tigers players
Vaasan Sport players
Vienna Capitals players
Sportspeople from Lower Austria